The XIII Corps of the Grande Armée was a French military unit that existed during the Napoleonic Wars. The corps was formed in the spring of 1813 and Marshal Louis-Nicolas Davout was appointed as its commander. The corps included three French infantry divisions and attached cavalry. During the German campaign, the XIII Corps was assigned to defend northern Germany. Accordingly, Davout seized Hamburg and prepared to defend it against the Allies. In September 1813, one brigade was defeated at the Battle of the Göhrde. After Emperor Napoleon I's decisive defeat at the Battle of Leipzig in October, the XIII Corps became isolated in Hamburg. An Allied army under Russian General Count von Bennigsen initiated the Siege of Hamburg in December.

Order of battle

Hamburg, 1814
XIII Corps: Marshal Louis-Nicolas Davout (40,000)
 3rd Division: General of Division Louis Henri Loison
 15th Light Infantry Regiment
 44th Line Infantry Regiment
 48th Line Infantry Regiment
 108th Line Infantry Regiment
 40th Division: General of Division Marc Nicolas Louis Pécheux
 33rd Light Infantry Regiment (2 battalions)
 30th Line Infantry Regiment (2 battalions)
 61st Line Infantry Regiment (2 battalions)
 111th Line Infantry Regiment (2 battalions)
 50th. Division: General of Division Paul Thiébault
 24th Light Infantry Regiment (2 battalions)
 3rd Line Infantry Regiment (2 battalions)
 29th Line Infantry Regiment (2 battalions)
 105th Line Infantry Regiment (2 battalions)
Danish Auxiliary Division: General Prince Prince Frederik of Hesse  
Avant Garde Brigade: Prince Frederik of Hesse
 2nd Battalion Schleswig Jaeger Corps
 1st & 2nd Battalions Holstein Sharpshooter Corps
 1st Battalion 3rd (Jutland) Infantry Regiment
 Holstein Heavy Cavalry Regiment (4 squadrons)
 17th Lithuanian Uhlan Regiment (2 squadrons)
 6pdr Foot Battery von Gerstenberg (8 guns)  
1st Brigade: General Graf Schulenburg
 1st & 4th Battalions Oldenburg Infantry Regiment
 3 Companies 2nd Battalion Oldernburg Infantry Regiment
 3rd & 4th Battalions Holstein Infantry Regiment
 2nd & 6th Squadrons Danish Hussar Regiment
 3pdr Foot Battery von Gonner (8 guns)
 6pdr Foot Battery Koye (8 guns)  
2nd. Brigade General Christian Friedrich Abercron
 1st & 2nd Battalions Funen Infantry Regiment
 1st & 2nd Battalions Schleswig Infantry Regiment
 Funen Light Dragoon Regiment (3 squadrons)
 6pdr Foot Battery Friis (10 guns)
 Cavalry Brigade:
 28th Chasseurs-à-Cheval Regiment
 17th Lithuanian Uhlan Regiment
 Other infantry elements:
 26th Light, 18th Line, 93rd Line, and 155th Line Infantry Regiments
 Other cavalry elements:
 4th, 8th, and 15th Cuirassier and 13th and 20th Dragoon Regiments
 5th Hussar and 2nd and 25th Chasseurs-à-Cheval Regiments

Source:

References

Chakoten (2013). Collection of Danish military history, the Danish Auxiliary regiment in North Germany

GAI13